Hosh al-Basha, also Hosh el-Basha, Hawsh al-Basha, or Hosh el-Pasha), is a mausoleum of the Royal Family of Muhammad Ali Pasha at road al-Imam Al-Shafi‘i in the Southern Cemetery of Cairo, Egypt.

Description
Hosh al-Pasha was built in 1854 to house several tombs of the Muhammad Ali dynasty’s family, relatives, and devoted servants. The structure is a six-domed complex with inner courtyards and chambers heavily decorated by Islamic motifs, colors and precious materials that still show much of the original luxurious and rich state of the place

Some of the members of the Muhammad Ali dynasty buried in Hosh al-Basha are Ibrahim Pasha, Tusun Pasha, Isma'il Pasha, Sa'id Pasha, Abbas I, Ahmad Rifaat Pasha and his daughter Ayn-al-Hayat Rifaat, and Mohammed Ali Tewfik.

See also
Muhammad Ali dynasty family tree
 List of mausolea

References

Notes

External links 
Hosh El Basha : Egypt's Royal Cemetery, https://www.youtube.com/watch?v=9ZFbaQAC5fg (in Arabic, but with visual tour of the mausoleum)
Hosh al-Basha photo at Alamy
Rulers of Egypt from the House of Mohammed Aly: https://web.archive.org/web/20080516115029/http://www.egy.com/P/royal/royaltree.html

Buildings and structures completed in 1854
Buildings and structures in Cairo
Domes
Ottoman architecture in Egypt
19th-century architecture in Egypt